Silver chloride is a chemical compound with the chemical formula AgCl. This white crystalline solid is well known for its low solubility in water (this behavior being reminiscent of the chlorides of Tl+ and Pb2+). Upon illumination or heating, silver chloride converts to silver (and chlorine), which is signaled by grey to black or purplish coloration to some samples. AgCl occurs naturally as a mineral chlorargyrite.

Preparation
Silver chloride is unusual in that, unlike most chloride salts, it has very low solubility. It is easily synthesized by metathesis: combining an aqueous solution of silver nitrate (which is soluble) with a soluble chloride salt, such as sodium chloride or cobalt(II) chloride. The silver chloride that forms will precipitate immediately.
AgNO3 + NaCl -> AgCl(v) + NaNO3
2 AgNO3 + CoCl2 -> 2 AgCl(v) + Co(NO3)2

Structure and reactions

The solid adopts the fcc NaCl structure, in which each Ag+ ion is surrounded by an octahedron of six chloride ligands. AgF and AgBr crystallize similarly. However, the crystallography depends on the condition of crystallization, primarily free silver ion concentration, as is shown on the pictures left (greyish tint and metallic lustre are due to partly reduced silver). AgCl dissolves in solutions containing ligands such as chloride, cyanide, triphenylphosphine, thiosulfate, thiocyanate and ammonia. Silver chloride reacts with these ligands according to the following illustrative equations:
AgCl (s) + Cl^- (aq) -> AgCl2^- (aq)

AgCl (s) + 2 S2O3^2- (aq) ->(Ag(S2O3)2)^3- (aq) + Cl^- (aq)

AgCl (s) + 2 NH3(aq) -> Ag(NH3)2+ (aq) + Cl^- (aq)
Silver chloride does not react with nitric acid.
Most complexes derived from AgCl are two-, three-, and, in rare cases, four-coordinate, adopting linear, trigonal planar, and tetrahedral coordination geometries, respectively.

3AgCl(s) + Na3AsO3(aq) -> Ag3AsO3(s) + 3NaCl(aq)

3AgCl(s) +Na3AsO4(aq) -> Ag3AsO4(s) + 3NaCl(aq)

Above 2 reactions are particularly important in qualitative analysis of AgCl in labs as AgCl is white in colour, which changes to Ag3AsO3 (silver arsenite) which is yellow in colour or Ag3AsO4(Silver arsenate) which is reddish brown in colour.

Chemistry

In one of the most famous reactions in chemistry, addition of colorless aqueous silver nitrate to an equally colorless solution of sodium chloride produces an opaque white precipitate of AgCl:
Ag+ (aq) + Cl^- (aq) -> AgCl (s)
This conversion is a common test for the presence of chloride in solution. Due to its conspicuousness it is easily used in titration, which gives the typical case of argentometry.

The chloride content of an aqueous solution can be determined quantitatively by weighing the precipitated AgCl, which conveniently is non-hygroscopic, since AgCl is one of the few transition metal chlorides that is unreactive toward water. Interfering ions for this test are bromide and iodide, as well as a variety of ligands (see silver halide). For AgBr and AgI, the Ksp values are 5.2 x 10−13 and 8.3 x 10−17, respectively. Silver bromide (slightly yellowish white) and silver iodide (bright yellow) are also significantly more photosensitive than is AgCl.

AgCl quickly darkens on exposure to light by disintegrating into elemental chlorine and metallic silver. This reaction is used in photography and film.

Uses
The silver chloride electrode is a common reference electrode in electrochemistry.
Silver chloride's low solubility makes it a useful addition to pottery glazes for the production of "Inglaze lustre".
Silver chloride has been used as an antidote for mercury poisoning, assisting in the elimination of mercury.
Silver chloride is used:
 to make photographic paper since it reacts with photons to form latent image and via photoreduction
 in photochromic lenses, again taking advantage of its reversible conversion to Ag metal
 in bandages and wound healing products
 to create yellow, amber, and brown shades in stained glass manufacture
 as an infrared transmissive optical component as it can be hot-pressed into window and lens shapes
 as an antimicrobial agent:
 in some personal deodorant products
 for long-term preservation of drinking water in water tanks

See also
 Photosensitive glass

References

Chlorides
Silver compounds
Metal halides
Coordination complexes
Photographic chemicals
Light-sensitive chemicals
Rock salt crystal structure